What The Hack was an outdoor hacker conference held in Liempde, Netherlands between the 28th and 31st of July, 2005.

Timeline
What the Hack was an event in a sequence that began with the Galactic Hacker Party in 1989, followed by Hacking at the End of the Universe in 1993, Hacking In Progress in 1997, Hackers At Large in 2001 and Hacking at Random in 2009. The most recent edition was Observe. Hack. Make. in 2013.

Attendance

Over 2000 hackers visited the event to participate in an exchange on several technical, social and philosophical matters of importance to the technically inclined community. 

Visitors from all over the world arrived at the Camp Ground including groups of such diversity as OpenBSD developers, the German Chaos Computer Club, members of the 2600: The Hacker Quarterly hackergroup, and numerous smaller groups and organisations in addition.

While planning the event, there were several issues with the local government attempting to cancel the event because of "the risk for public security".

Several smaller events were embedded in or inspired by this event like the Hacktrain, which was planned to travel there, as well as the local radio station, and the smaller Police village which featured specialists from their IT Department, as well as interested government parties. Peg DHCP was used during the event to allocate IP addresses. The method had been first devised and used at Hacking In Progress.

Activities
Some of the lectures and events this edition were:
 Reverse engineering Microsoft .NET
 Cyborgs: Practical Experimentation
 Attacks on Digital Passports
 Using Linux for Embedded Devices
 Doing a WiFi Long-Shot
 Symbian Security
 Do We Run Out of Oil?
 How to Lower Electricity Consumption in Your Home
 The Politics of Psychedelic Research
 OpenStreetMap

See also
 Hacker con
 MTV What the Hack! - is a TV show on MTV India co-hosted by VJ Jose & Ankit Fadia

Media coverage
The What The Hack press page (contains links to many articles, mostly in Dutch or German).

References

Links
 Official webpage archived at Wayback Machine
 Talk video downloads

Hacker conventions
Free-software events
Computer conferences